There Is No Santa Claus! was one of five singles Servotron released in 1996. It was released black vinyl only on Amphetamine Reptile Records.

Track listing
Efficient Side: 
"Christmas Day of the Robot"
Insensitive Side:
"Servotron Sonic Evaluation of the Christmas Season"
"Death of the Sugarplum Fairy"

Santa's Mechanical Helpers
MACHINE 1: Z4-OBX - Bionic Drummer Boy
MACHINE 2: Proto Unit V3 - Push button church choir
MACHINE 3: 00zX1 - Data processing mannequin with implanted Scrooge Program
MACHINE 4: Gammatron - Remote controlled door to door caroler

Other Credits
Design/Illustration: Shag (after Ed Emshwiller)

References 

Servotron albums
1996 EPs